Erica Banks (born October 5, 1998) is an American rapper born and raised in DeSoto, Texas. Following the release of her first three mixtapes, she signed to 1501 Certified Entertainment, who released her self-titled mixtape in June 2020. It spawned her first charting single, "Buss It", which went viral on TikTok. In January 2021, she signed to Warner Records, on which "Buss It" was reissued.

Early life 
Banks was born and raised in DeSoto, Texas. At the age of 12, she began writing poetry, winning several school contests, and started rapping in high school. While attending Texas A&M University–Commerce as a nursing student, she recorded her first songs, leading to her to decide to drop out during her sophomore year to pursue her music career.

Career 
In 2018, Banks released her first single, titled "Talk My Shit" independently through SoundCloud. On March 17, 2019, Banks subsequently self-released her first official mixtape, titled Art of the Hustle. In April 2019, she signed with 1501 Certified Entertainment after playing a snippet of her song "Buss It" for the label's CEO, American former baseball player Carl Crawford, in an Instagram Live video. Despite after signing with 1501 Certified, two of her mixtapes  Pressure and Cocky on Purpose  were subsequently self-released between June and November of that year.

On June 19, 2020, Banks released her self-titled fourth mixtape through 1501 Certified. The mixtape spawned the singles, including a full version of the song "Buss It", and "Give Me That", the former of which became Banks's breakout song in January 2021 after becoming the subject of a viral trend on the video-sharing platform TikTok, giving her her first entry on the Billboard Hot 100 chart. In that same month, she signed a record deal with Warner Records. Later in that same month, she was featured on American rapper Yella Beezy's single "Star".

Artistry 
Banks has listed rappers Missy Elliott, Lil' Kim, and Nicki Minaj among her musical inspirations, and Asian Doll as an influence for music and image. Musically, she has been compared by fans to American rapper Megan Thee Stallion and Ti from the Taylor Girlz.

Discography

Studio albums

Mixtapes

Extended plays

Singles

As lead artist

As featured artist

Awards and nominations

References 

Living people
1998 births
People from DeSoto, Texas
21st-century American rappers
21st-century American women musicians
Rappers from Dallas
African-American women rappers
Warner Records artists
21st-century African-American women
21st-century African-American musicians
21st-century women rappers